John Thomas Haines (c.1799–1843) was a British actor and dramatist.

Life
Born about 1799, from 1823 for two decades he supplied the smaller London theatres with melodramas of the "blood-and-thunder" type, with general success. His sea-plays were vehicles for T. P. Cooke, and My Poll and my Partner Joe, a nautical drama in three acts, produced at the Surrey Theatre on 7 September 1835, was notably profitable.

Haines occasionally acted in his own pieces. He died at Stockwell on 18 May 1843, aged 44, at the time stage-manager of the English Opera House.

Works
Among Haines's plays were:

 The Idiot Witness; or a Tale of Blood, melodrama in two acts (Coburg Theatre, 1823). 
 Jacob Faithful; or the Life of a Thames Waterman, domestic local drama in three acts (Surrey Theatre, 14 December 1834). 
 Richard Plantagenet, historical drama in three acts (Victoria Theatre, 1836). 
 The Ocean of Life; or Every Inch a Sailor, nautical drama in three acts (Surrey Theatre, 4 April 1836). 
 Maidens Beware!, burletta in one act (Victoria Theatre, January 1837). 
 Breakers Ahead! or a Seaman's Log, nautical drama in three acts (Victoria Theatre, 10 April 1837). 
 Angeline Le Lis, original drama in one act (St. James's Theatre, 29 September 1837). 
 The Charming Polly; or Lucky or Unlucky Days, drama in two acts (Surrey Theatre, 29 June 1838). 
 Alice Grey, the Suspected One; or the Moral Brand, domestic drama in three acts (Surrey Theatre, 1 April 1839). 
 Nick of the Woods; or the Altar of Revenge, a melodrama (Victoria Theatre, 1839). 
 The Wizard of the Wave; or the Ship of the Avenger, a legendary nautical drama in three acts (Victoria Theatre, 2 September 1840). 
 The Yew Tree Ruins; or the Wreck, the Miser, and the Mines, domestic drama in three acts (11 Jan. 1841). 
 Ruth; or the Lass that Loves a Sailor, a nautical and domestic drama in three acts (Victoria Theatre, 23 January 1843). 
 Austerlitz; or the Soldier's Bride, melodrama in three acts (Queen's Theatre). 
 Amilie, or the Love Test, opera in three acts. 
 The Wraith of the Lake; or the Brownie's Brig, melodrama in three acts. 
 Rattlin the Reefer; or the Tiger of the Sea, nautical drama in three acts.

Haines also adapted and arranged from the French of Eugène Scribe and Jules-Henri Vernoy de Saint-Georges the songs, duets, quartettes, recitatives, and choruses in the opera of Queen for a Day. Set to music by Adolphe Adam, it was first performed at the Surrey Theatre on 14 June 1841.

Notes

Attribution

1799 births
1843 deaths
British dramatists and playwrights
British male stage actors
British male dramatists and playwrights
19th-century British dramatists and playwrights
19th-century British male writers